The University of Pennsylvania Stuart Weitzman School of Design is the design school of the University of Pennsylvania, in Philadelphia. It offers degrees in architecture, landscape architecture, city and regional planning, historic preservation, and fine arts, as well as several dual degrees with other graduate schools at the University of Pennsylvania. Formerly known as PennDesign, it was renamed in 2019 after Stuart Weitzman donated an undisclosed sum.

Notable alumni

 Julian Abele
 William J. Bain
 Eugenie L. Birch
 Frank L. Bodine
 Eduardo Catalano
 James Corner
 Paul Davidoff
 Frank Miles Day
 Joseph Esherick
 Sheldon Fox
 Marco Frascari
 Bruce Graham
 Charles Gwathmey
 Henry C. Hibbs
 Eric J. Hill
 John Hoke III
 Leicester Bodine Holland
 Louis Kahn
 Stephen Kieran
 A. Eugene Kohn
 William Harold Lee
 Richard Longstreth
 Qingyun Ma
 Louis Magaziner
 Milton Bennett Medary, Jr.
 Frederick Augustus Muhlenberg
 Jayson Musson
 Barton Myers
 John Nolen
 Rai Okamoto
 I. M. Pei
 Lionel Pries
 Leslie Richards
 Jenny Sabin
 Adèle Naudé Santos
 Jacolby Satterwhite
 Denise Scott Brown
 Wael Shawky
 James Timberlake
 Anne Tyng
 David A. Wallace
 William Ward Watkin
 Georgina Pope Yeatman

Gallery

See also
PennPraxis
T.C. Chan Center for Building Simulation and Energy Studies

References

External links
 

1914 establishments in Pennsylvania
Design schools in the United States
Design, School of